Kurwongbah is a rural locality in the Moreton Bay Region, Queensland, Australia.

Geography 
A section of the eastern boundary of the locality is roughly aligned with the North Coast railway line.

In the south east of the locality is Sideling Creek Dam which created the reservoir Lake Kurwongbah. On the shores of the lake is the Lakeside Park, a motor racing venue.

A large quarry in the south is accessed by Dunlop Lane and owned by Holcim.

Brisbane–Woodford Road (Dayboro Road) runs along the south-western boundary.

History
The name Kurwongbah is alleged to be the Kabi name for Sideling Creek, meaning "black duck". The name was chosen by a local newspaper competition in 1958. 

Sideling Creek Dam was built in 1958.

Kurwongbah State School opened on 28 January 1986. Despite the name, it is within the suburb boundaries of neighbouring Petrie.

The median age of the Kurwongbah population was 38 years, 1 year above the national median of 37. 81.4% of people living in Kurwongbah were born in Australia. The other top responses for country of birth were England 4.2%, New Zealand 3.6%, South Africa 1.4%, Netherlands 0.6%, Germany 0.5%. 93.8% of people spoke only English at home; the next most common languages were 0.6% Dutch, 0.4% Italian, 0.3% Indonesian, 0.2% Afrikaans, 0.2% German.

Education 
There are no schools in Kurwongbah. The nearest government primary schools are Petrie State School and Kurwongbah State School, both in neighbouring Petrie to the south-east, and Narangba State School and Narangba Valley State School, both in neighbouring Narangba to the north. The nearest government secondary schools are Narangba Valley State High School in neighbouring Narangba to the north, Dakabin State High School in neighbouring Dakabin to the east, and Bray Park State High School in Bray Park to the south-east.

References

External links 

 

 
Suburbs of Moreton Bay Region
Localities in Queensland